Kelvin Jones (born January 30, 1982) is a retired American soccer player.

Career

Youth and college
Jones attended Massaponax High School, where he was named the 2000 Virginia High School Player of the Year, and was a member of the Region I ODP and adidas ESP Teams, and played college soccer at Wake Forest University, where he made 61 appearances over four seasons registered four goals and five assists.

Professional
Jones turned professional in 2004 when he signed with the Charleston Battery of the USL First Division. Injury limited his time with the Battery to just 12 appearances in two years, and he was waived by the team at the end of the 2005 season. He subsequently signed for the Richmond Kickers and has been with the team ever since, making over 80 appearances in total. He was part of the Richmond teams which won the USL Second Division championships in 2006 and 2009.
Jones is one of the founders and player/coach of the semi-pro indoor soccer team the Fredericksburg Generals of the PASL.

Coaching career
In 2017, Jones joined the Columbus Crew SC Academy as a head coach for their U-12 boys team. In September 2020 he was named the Crew SC Academy Director.

References

External links
Richmond Kickers bio
Wake Forest bio

1982 births
Living people
American soccer players
Charleston Battery players
Richmond Kickers players
USL First Division players
USL Second Division players
Soccer players from Virginia
Wake Forest Demon Deacons men's soccer players
Association football defenders